Daryl Anthony Sconiers (born October 3, 1958) is an American former professional baseball first baseman.

Sconiers attended Fontana High School in Fontana, California though he told the Los Angeles Times his friends were not interested in school and he attended only often enough to maintain eligibility for the school's baseball team. As a senior at Fontana, he had a batting average of .515. He was undrafted out of high school and played college baseball at Orange Coast College.

For a period in May 1982, Sconiers was absent from the team without permission or explanation and the Angels organization was unable to locate or contact him. After the same occurred during spring training in 1985, Sconiers admitted to having a substance abuse problem. He was let go after the season and never played in the major leagues again. Before his release, he was considered the heir apparent to future Hall of Famer Rod Carew's starting first base job. He continued to play in the minor leagues until .

In 1986 and 1987, Sconiers played unaffiliated ball with the San Jose Bees along with several other former Major League players who had been afflicted by substance abuse problems. Sconiers once went missing from the team for three days on a crack cocaine binge.

References

Sources

1958 births
Living people
African-American baseball players
American expatriate baseball players in Canada
Baseball players from California
California Angels players
Edmonton Trappers players
El Paso Diablos players
Hawaii Islanders players
Idaho Falls Angels players
Major League Baseball first basemen
Midland Angels players
Orange Coast Pirates baseball players
Quad Cities Angels players
Salinas Angels players
Salt Lake City Gulls players
San Jose Bees players
Spokane Indians players
Sportspeople from San Bernardino, California
Vancouver Canadians players
21st-century African-American people
20th-century African-American sportspeople